Zafonic (1 April 1990 – 7 September 2002) was a European Thoroughbred racehorse bred in Kentucky. He was the 1992 European Champion Two-Year-Old Colt and won the following year's 2,000 Guineas.

Background

Zafonic was sired by the Mr. Prospector stallion Gone West, out of the Seaton Delaval Stakes winner Zaizafon, a daughter of The Minstrel. He was owned and bred by Khalid Abdullah and conditioned by the French trainer André Fabre.

Racing career

Racing at age two, Zafonic went undefeated. After winning a minor race at Deauville in August, he followed up with a win in the Group One Prix Morny at the same course ten days later. Three weeks later in the Prix de la Salamandre at Longchamp, he took the lead in the straight and pulled clear to beat Kingmambo by three lengths.  He then was shipped to the Newmarket Racecourse in the United Kingdom where he won the Dewhurst Stakes by four lengths in "very impressive" style. His 1992 performance earned him the Cartier Racing Award as Europe's Champion Two-Year-Old Colt.

At three, Zafonic started at 10-1 ON for his debut in the Prix Djebel but lost his unbeaten record when he was beaten a short head by Kingmambo. Sent back to Newmarket for the British Classic, the 2,000 Guineas, Zafonic won by 3½ lengths from Barathea and breaking a 45-year-old course record. In the Sussex Stakes, the colt burst a blood vessel and finished seventh.

Stud career

His racing career over, Zafonic was sent to his owner's Banstead Manor Stud near the village of Cheveley in East Cambridgeshire. He sired more than two dozen stakes winners including Xaar, the 1997 European 2-Year-Old Champion and winner of the Dewhurst Stakes and Prix de la Salamandre, Count Dubois (Gran Criterium), Zafeen (St James's Palace Stakes), Iffraaj and Trade Fair.

In August 2002, Zafonic's owner leased him for the southern hemisphere covering season to Arrowfield Stud in Scone, New South Wales, Australia. Only a few days after being released from quarantine, Zafonic died on 7 September 2002 as the result of an accident at Arrowfield's paddock.

Pedigree

References

1990 racehorse births
2002 racehorse deaths
Racehorses bred in Kentucky
Racehorses trained in France
Cartier Award winners
Thoroughbred family 9-e
2000 Guineas winners